Garnett Genuis   (born January 23, 1987) is a Canadian politician who has served as the member of Parliament for the riding of Sherwood Park—Fort Saskatchewan (in Alberta) since 2015.

Early life
Genuis was born in 1987 and grew up in Strathcona County, before moving to attend Carleton University in Ottawa where he obtained a bachelor's degree in Public Affairs and Policy Management in February 2010. While there, he wrote a regular column for the Sherwood Park News as a political correspondent. Genuis’ experience helped him obtain a position as assistant to former Prime Minister Stephen Harper and adviser on the staff of former minister Rona Ambrose. Genuis then obtained a master's degree in public policy from the London School of Economics in December 2011.

Political career

2012: Alberta general election
Genuis ran in the 2012 Alberta general election as the Wildrose MLA candidate for Sherwood Park. He lost to Progressive Conservative candidate Cathy Olesen.

2015 Term: Maclean's Parliamentarian of the Year
In March 2014, Genuis announced his intention to seek the Conservative nomination for the 2015 Canadian federal election in the newly formed riding of Sherwood Park—Fort Saskatchewan. He won the nomination in November 2014. Genuis won the federal election on October 19, 2015, capturing 64% of the votes in the riding and becoming its member of Parliament. The Conservative government of the day lost the election to the Liberals.

In November 2015, Genuis was appointed deputy critic for Human Rights and Religious Freedom. He served under head critic David Anderson. On August 30, 2017, he was made Deputy Shadow Minister for Foreign Affairs, after leaving his previous position.

In March 2016, Genuis was named one of the most outspoken MPs in the House of Commons by Maclean's Magazine. In November 2017, Genuis was named Maclean's Parliamentarian of the Year, based on a vote by members of the House of Commons. Genuis was the youngest recipient to date of the award.

In a 2017 episode of the television series Political Blind Date, Genuis and Nathaniel Erskine-Smith, the Liberal MP for Beaches—East York, discussed their differing perspectives on the legalization of marijuana in Canada.

In May 2019, Genuis supported Conservative leader Andrew Scheer's vision for a new foreign policy.

2019 Term: Shadow Minister for Multiculturalism & International Development and Human Rights
Genuis was re-elected to the 43rd Canadian Parliament on October 21, 2019, with 73.4% of the popular vote. His party, however, only won 121 of 338 seats, so he remained in opposition. In 2019, he was given the role as Shadow Minister for Multiculturalism by then leader of the Conservative Party Andrew Scheer.

Genuis was a member of the House of Commons Special Committee on Canada-China Relations. He has voiced concerns over Huawei's influence on Canadian campuses. Genuis was openly hostile to the appointment of Dominic Barton as Canada's ambassador to China, suggesting that Barton's past work advising more than 20 Chinese state-owned enterprises put him in a conflict of interest. Genuis was appointed as the shadow minister for international development and human rights by the Conservative Party of Canada's new leader Erin O'Toole in September 2020.

2021 Term: Shadow Minister for International Development 
Genius was re-elected to the 44th Canadian Parliament in the 2021 Canadian federal election with 57.5% of the popular vote in his constituency. Though he faced a 16% decline in support compared to the 2019 general election. Following the election, Genius was vocally supportive of Erin O'Toole's leadership of the party after the latter faced criticism for failing to increase the party's seat count from 2019.

Garnett Genuis is currently a committee member of FAAE (Foreign Affairs and International Development) & CIMM (Standing Committee on Citizenship and Immigration).

In June 2022, Genuis made a trip to Nigeria. He sat down for a conversation with Nigerian Vice President Yemi Osinbajo and had an interview with Catholic Television of Nigeria.

Policies

Human Rights Advocacy 
Genuis has been a strong supporter of the Tibet cause. In January 2016, Genuis met with the Dalai Lama to discuss human rights and religious freedom.

In April 2022, Genuis introduced private member motion M-57. This called on the Canadian government to support bystander intervention training as a tool to combat sexual harassment and violence, hate crimes, and other forms of criminal activity.

Genuis supported Bill S-223, An Act to amend the Criminal Code and the Immigration and Refugee Protection Act (trafficking in human organs). This bill aims to protect people from the exploitative practices of organ harvesting.

Genuis jointly seconded the private member's bill C-281, known as the International Human Rights Act, sponsored by Philip Lawrence (politician). This Bill contains several different important measures aimed at advancing international human rights, including changes to the Magnitsky Act, the Broadcasting Act, and the Prohibiting Cluster Munitions Act.

In June 2022, Genuis, along with Senator Leo Housakos, hosted a press conference with Enes Kanter Freedom. The focus of the press conference was to advocate for human rights; focusing on Uyghurs in the Chinese Communist Party controlled Xinjiang Region. There, the Canadian government was called on to stop the importation of products made with forced labour coming from the Xinjiang Region.

Genuis has created various petitions to raise awareness and advocate for various international issues such as the Uyghur genocide
, the Tigray War and Human Rights for Minorities in Pakistan.

Democratic Advocacy 
Genuis spoke about democratic decline in Canada in the House of Commons, citing the International Institute for Democracy and Electoral Assistance in Stockholm. He said, “In the key category of checks on government, Canada’s score has dropped precipitously since 2015. We are now lower than the United States and every single country in western Europe. Weakening checks on government power is weakening Canadian democracy, and international experts are noticing.”

In July 2022, Genuis also authored an opinion piece on True North, where he wrote, “We are currently dealing with the failure of the government to hand over documents ordered by Parliament, the arbitrary use of the Emergencies Act and failure to hand over cabinet documents to the inquiry charged with looking into that action, the imposition of a draconian “Motion 11,” that gives the executive unprecedented powers to control the Parliamentary agenda, and alleged interference by the government in an RCMP investigation. These are just the key elements of democratic decline that we have seen in the last few months.”

International Development 
Genuis has been a vocal advocate for Bill S-216 – An Act to amend the Income Tax Act (use of resources of a registered charity). S-216 also known as the Effective Charities Act, seeks to amend the Income Tax Act to ensure that charities can effectively collaborate with a wider range of charities (both domestic and international) including those without charitable status. Genuis has worked alongside Senator Ratna Omidvar, local and international stakeholders to call for this reformation. In Episode 22 of the Resuming Debate podcast, MP Genuis talks to the Senator about S-216 and its importance to domestic and international charities and developmental organizations.

Energy Security 
Genuis has been an outspoken supporter of promoting energy security in the West using Canadian oil and gas, especially since the Russian invasion of Ukraine began. In a House of Commons speech, he said, “Canada should fuel democracy by providing our European friends with a conflict-free and reliable alternative, and one that is, in many cases, better for the environment than the other options available.”

Family Policy 
Garnett has been identified by the Campaign Life Coalition as having a perfect voting score for Life and family issues introduced to the House of Commons. Contributors to the Sherwood Park-Fort Saskatchewan Conservative Riding Association sponsored pro-children ads that appeared on buses in Vancouver, BC.

Genius voted in support of Bill C-233 - An Act to amend the Criminal Code (sex-selective abortion), to combat sex-based discrimination, making it a criminal offence for a medical practitioner to knowingly perform an abortion sought solely on the grounds of the child's genetic sex.

On June 22, 2021, Genuis was one of 63 MPs to vote against Bill C-6, An Act to amend the Criminal Code (conversion therapy), which was passed by majority vote, making certain aspects of conversion therapy a crime, including "causing a child to undergo conversion therapy." Genuis stated he thinks banning conversion therapy is reasonable, but Bill C-6 was too broad in scope, and therefore did more than ban conversion therapy. Genuis consequently called on the Canadian government to fix the definition of "Conversion Therapy" in Bill C-6 by doing many things, one of which would be to ensure that no laws discriminate against Canadians by limiting what services they can receive based on their sexual orientation or gender identity.

Church and State 
Genuis believes in the philosophical principle of the separation of church and state. This is partly why he voted against a request for papal apology for the Catholic Church's role in residential schools. The motion was put forward in reaction to the discovery of 215 unmarked graves of children at the former Kamloops Indian Residential School, and was a reiteration of the same motion tabled in May 2018.

Media

Podcast (Resuming Debate)
Genuis hosts a podcast called Resuming Debate, where a wide range of experts, authors, and academics speak on diverse topics. The stated purpose of the podcast is to inject an element of civil conversation/debate into the Canadian political climate. Some notable Resuming Debate podcast topics include Fighting Modern Slavery, The Ukrainian Church and the Fight Against Putin, Religious Symbols in the Public Service, and Woke Capitalism. Some notable guests from the Resuming Debate podcast include Charles Hoskinson, Ross Douthat, Andrew Bennett (academic), and Bob Fu. Resuming Debate is available on Apple Podcasts, Spotify, Anchor and YouTube.

Written Articles
Genuis sometimes contributes to outlets like The Sherwood Park-Strathcona County News and the True North. He has written on topics of national importance, like the opioid crisis, the state of democracy, and political discrimination.

Personal life
Genuis is a Roman Catholic. He is married to Dr. Rebecca Genuis and together, they have five children. Genuis regularly returns on the weekend to his riding of Sherwood Park—Fort Saskatchewan for the purpose of being with his family, attending local events and interacting with his constituents.

Publications

Electoral record

Federal

Provincial

References

External links
China’s “Elite Capture” of Canada | Garnett Genuis, China Uncensored, September 9, 2020.

1987 births
Living people
Canadian columnists
Canadian Roman Catholics
Conservative Party of Canada MPs
Members of the House of Commons of Canada from Alberta
Wildrose Party candidates in Alberta provincial elections
Alumni of the London School of Economics
Carleton University alumni
21st-century Canadian politicians
People from Sherwood Park